Notturna di Milano is an annual track and field meeting which is held in September at the Arena Civica in Milan, Italy. First held in 1998, the meeting received IAAF permit meeting status the following year. In its earlier years, men's sprinting was one of the primary attractions of the meeting, with former world record holders Donovan Bailey and Tim Montgomery among those competing.

The third edition of the meeting attracted many prominent athletes including Olympic champion Haile Gebrselassie and World Champion sprinter Dennis Mitchell (world record holder Maurice Greene was also set to compete but withdrew due to illness). Home athlete Fabrizio Donato set a historic national record of 17.60 m in the triple jump (an improvement of Paolo Camossi's mark by almost a third of a metre). That same year, the meeting also had a failed drugs test – Mihaela Melinte, the world record holder in the women's hammer throw and favourite for the Olympic title that year, was banned for two years for taking nandrolone. The 2002 meeting attracted numerous Olympic and World medallists.

The event was cancelled in 2006 and the Milan venue was the setting for the 2007 European Cup instead. The meeting returned to the European athletics calendar in 2008 and was highlighted by performances from Italians Elisa Cusma and Antonietta Di Martino, and also a national record run by Bahraini sprinter Roqaya Al-Gassra. The competition gained European Athletics meeting permit status in 2009. That year's events were dedicated to the memory of Candido Cannavò (former editor of Gazzetta dello Sport) who had played an integral part in the inception of the meeting. The meeting organisers also allocated the profits of the ticket sales towards those affected by the 2009 L'Aquila earthquake.

Emerging French sprinter Christophe Lemaitre was one of the prime attractions of the 2010 (given his North Italian heritage) and reigning World Champion Caster Semenya improved the 800 metres meeting record. In addition to the competitive action, Stefano Baldini – the 2004 Olympic marathon champion – was presented with the Candido Cannavò Award for his athletics achievements.

World records
Over the course of its history, two world records have been set at the Notturna di Milano.

Meeting records

Men

Women

See also
Golden Gala
Rieti Meeting
Memorial Primo Nebiolo

References

External links 
Official website
Meeting records (archived)

Annual track and field meetings
IAAF Grand Prix
Sports competitions in Milan
Athletics competitions in Italy
Recurring sporting events established in 1998
Autumn events in Italy
1998 establishments in Italy
IAAF World Outdoor Meetings